Souk El Kouafi is one of the souks of the medina of Tunis, specialized in selling women caps.

Location 
It is located in the east of Al-Zaytuna Mosque.

Notes and references 

Kouafi